Moyer MacClaren Bupp (January 10, 1928 – November 1, 2007) professionally known as Sonny Bupp, was an American child film actor and businessman. His most notable film was Citizen Kane (1941), in which he appears as Junior, Charles Foster Kane III, the eight-year-old son of Charles Foster Kane and his first wife, Emily. Bupp was the last surviving credited member of the Citizen Kane cast at his death.

Career

Born Moyer MacClaren Bupp in New York City, Sonny Bupp was the brother of actors Tommy (1924–1983), June (1913–1989) and Ann Bupp (1922–2005). He appeared in over 60 films during his career, including two Our Gang comedies, 1935's Our Gang Follies of 1936 and 1938's Men in Fright.

He appeared in Citizen Kane as the son of Charles Foster Kane, and was the last surviving credited cast member of that film. He also appeared in the 1937 Three Stooges' Cash and Carry, as well as such films as Love Is on the Air (Ronald Reagan's first film), The Renegade Trail, Annie Oakley (with Barbara Stanwyck), Kid Millions, Angels With Dirty Faces,  The Devil and Daniel Webster and Tennessee Johnson.

Later life
He served in the U.S. Army during the Korean War and, after his film career ended, became an auto industry executive. He died in Henderson, Nevada, aged 79, from an undisclosed cause. His remains are interred at Southern Nevada Veterans Memorial Cemetery in Boulder City, Nevada.

Filmography

References

Bibliography

 Holmstrom, John (1996). The Moving Picture Boy: An International Encyclopaedia from 1895 to 1995. Norwich: Michael Russell, p. 156-157.

External links

1928 births
2007 deaths
American male child actors
American male film actors
United States Army personnel of the Korean War
Male actors from New York City
20th-century American male actors
Burials at Southern Nevada Veterans Memorial Cemetery
United States Army soldiers